Venta Icenorum (literally "marketplace of the Iceni") was the civitas or capital of the Iceni tribe, located at modern-day Caistor St Edmund in the English county of Norfolk. The Iceni inhabited the flatlands and marshes of that county and are famous for having revolted against Roman rule under their queen Boudica in the winter of AD 61.

Roman town 
The town itself was probably laid out, and its first streets metalled, in approximately the first half of the second century. The site lies on the River Tas.

Archaeology 
In 1928, an aerial reconnaissance flight of a farm near Caistor St Edmund rediscovered the ruins of Venta Icenorum. A five-year archaeological dig soon followed, led by archaeologist Donald Atkinson. 

The  site subsequently remained uninvestigated until the University of Nottingham reopened it in 2009 seeking Iron Age (Iceni) structures beneath the town. The evidence uncovered revealed that the site was not established on a previous Iron Age town, but was a newly built and sparsely populated frontier town focused on administration and trade. It also revealed a partial integration of the mainly agrarian locals into Roman norms.

The embankments of Venta Icenorum can still be seen at Caistor today. The ruins are in the care of The Norfolk Archaeological Trust and managed by South Norfolk District Council. In 2011, the Trust expanded the site by buying an additional 55 acres of land across the river opposite the West Gate.

See also
Pye Road
Boudica's Way

References

Bibliography

External links
 http://www.livescience.com/history/071217-roman-town.html LiveScience - New Details of Ancient Roman Town Uncovered

Archaeology of Norfolk
Roman towns and cities in England
Former populated places in Norfolk
Roman sites in Norfolk
South Norfolk
Iceni